The Bulgarian-Serbian War of 853 was fought between the First Bulgarian Empire and the Serbian Principality. It was the second conflict of the medieval Bulgarian–Serbian Wars.

Prelude and the War
After the death of Prince Vlastimir of Serbia in  850, his state was divided between his sons. Vlastimir and Presian, Boris' father, had fought each other in the Bulgar-Serb War (839–42), which resulted in a Serbian victory. Boris sought to avenge that defeat, an in 853 or 854, the Bulgar army led by Vladimir-Rasate, the son of Boris I, invaded Serbia, with the aim to replace the Byzantine overlordship on the Serbs. The Serbian army was led by Mutimir and his two brothers, who defeated the Bulgars, capturing Vladimir and 12 boyars. Boris I and Mutimir agreed on peace (and perhaps an alliance), and Mutimir sent his sons Pribislav and Stefan to the border to escort the prisoners, where they exchanged items as a sign of peace. Boris himself gave them "rich gifts", while he was given "two slaves, two falcons, two dogs, and 80 furs".

Aftermath
An internal conflict among the Serbian brothers resulted in Mutimir banishing the two younger brothers to the Bulgarian court. Mutimir, however, kept a nephew, Petar, in his court for political reasons. The reason of the feud is not known, though it is postulated that it was a result of treachery. Petar would later defeat Pribislav, Mutimir's son, and take the Serbian throne.

See also
 Bulgarian–Serbian medieval wars
 Bulgar-Serb War (839–42)
 Medieval Bulgarian Army
 Medieval Serbian Army

References

Sources
Primary sources
 

Secondary sources

 
 
 
 

9th century in Serbia
9th century in Bulgaria
Wars involving medieval Serbian states
Wars involving the First Bulgarian Empire
850s conflicts
Byzantine–Bulgarian Wars
Bulgarian–Serbian Wars
Principality of Serbia (early medieval)